Tetartostylus is a genus of leafhoppers in the subfamily Deltocephalinae. It is the only genus is the monotypic tribe Tetartostylini. Tetartostylini also used to include the genus Hiltus, but Hiltus is now placed in the tribe Paralimnini.

Species 
There are currently 11 described species in Tetartostylus:

References 

Deltocephalinae